Floral Hall, also known as The Round House, is a historic building located on the Jay County Fairgrounds in Wayne Township, Jay County, Indiana.  It was built in 1891, and is a -story, octagonal frame building with vertical board siding with battens.  Each side measures approximately 33 feet long.

It was listed on the National Register of Historic Places in 1983.

References

Octagonal buildings in the United States
Commercial buildings on the National Register of Historic Places in Indiana
Buildings and structures completed in 1891
Buildings and structures in Jay County, Indiana
National Register of Historic Places in Jay County, Indiana